Matteo Bruscagin (born 3 August 1989) is an Italian professional footballer who plays as a defender for  club Pordenone.

Club career 
Bruscagin started playing football as a child at amateur club Aldini Bariviera, before joining Milan in 2000. After spending eight years in their youth system, Bruscagin was loaned out to Monza for the 2008–09 season. In January 2009, he was called back due to lack of playing time and sent to Pizzighettone on another loan spell. With his new team, the young defender was eventually able to make his professional debut and a total 12 appearances during the remainder of the season.

At the start of the 2009–10 season, Bruscagin was loaned out again, this time to Gubbio. The following year, he was signed by Grosseto in a co-ownership deal with Milan, for a peppercorn of €1,000. In June 2011 Grosseto acquired Bruscagin outright for free.

In the summer of 2017 Bruscagin signed for newly promoted Serie B club Venezia.

On 23 August 2019, he signed a two-year contract with Vicenza.

On 30 September 2022, Bruscagin joined Serie C club Pordenone for the 2022–23 season.

International career 
Bruscagin took part in the 2009 FIFA U-20 World Cup with the Italy U-20 squad.

Personal life 
On 11 November 2020, he tested positive for COVID-19.

References

External links 
Profile at Assocalciatori.it 
Profile at EmozioneCalcio.it 
Profile at MagliaRossonera.it 
International Caps at FIGC.it 

1989 births
Living people
Footballers from Milan
Italian footballers
Italy youth international footballers
Association football defenders
A.C. Milan players
A.C. Monza players
A.S. Pizzighettone players
A.S. Gubbio 1910 players
F.C. Grosseto S.S.D. players
Latina Calcio 1932 players
Venezia F.C. players
L.R. Vicenza players
Pordenone Calcio players
Serie B players
Serie C players